Mychal Anthony Sisson (born October 1, 1988 in Indianapolis, Indiana) is an American football linebacker.

Sisson ranked second among the nation's freshmen (behind Oklahoma's Travis Lewis) with a team-leading 105 tackles (57 solo), including eight stops for loss and ½ quarterback sack, while breaking up three passes, forcing a fumble, and recovering two more, one of which he returned for a touchdown. He subsequently earned Sporting News′ Freshman All-American team honors.

References

External links
Colorado State Rams bio

1988 births
Living people
Players of American football from Indianapolis
People from Duncanville, Texas
American football linebackers
Colorado State Rams football players